The Association of Revolutionary Visual Artists of Germany (German: Assoziation revolutionärer bildender Künstler Deutschlands, or ARBKD) was an organization of artists who were members of the Communist Party of Germany (Kommunistische Partei Deutschlands, or KPD). Known primarily by its shortened name, "Asso", it was founded in March 1928. The organization produced posters, placards, propaganda graphics for Communist organizations.

History 

The Rote Fahne reported on 19 June 1928 that the Asso had been founded as a "brother organization" to the Association of Revolutionary Artists of Russia. In spring 1931, the name was changed from "Assoziation" to "Bund" ("Federation").

Left-wing artists had already formed groups, such as the November Group, Dadaist groups, or from 1924 to 1926, the Red Group, with which George Grosz, John Heartfield and Rudolf Schlichter were involved. Heinrich Vogeler had also formed the Arbeitsgemeinschaft kommunistischer Künstler ("Working Group of Communist Artists"). Further impetus to form a larger organization came from the "Central Atelier for Visual Propaganda", an arm of the KPD offices at the Karl-Liebknecht-Haus in Berlin.

Several groups joined the Asso. Gregor Gog's artists group, the Brotherhood of Vagabonds ("Bruderschaft der Vagabunden") joined the Asso in 1931. In 1932, Oskar Nerlinger's group, "The Moderns" ("Die Zeitgemäßen"), previously called "The Abstracts", joined as well. The Asso also embraced Franz Wilhelm Seiwert's group of progressive artists, the Cologne Progressives, and the "Collective for Socialist Building".

The Asso published a journal called Der Stoßtrupp and its first exhibition was in Berlin in 1929. For many Communist artists, art was a "weapon" to be used rallying the masses to the class struggle. Accordingly, the Asso produced placards, posters, propaganda art and banners for the Communist Party, Rote Hilfe and other organizations.

The organization, with 800 members, was banned after the Nazis seized power in 1933.

Notable members 

 Karl von Appen, 1932 
 , 1929
 , 1928 (Berlin)
 Rudolf Bergander, 1930 (Dresden)
 , Brotherhood of Vagabonds
 Erich Arnold Bischof
 , 1929? (Dresden)
 
 , 1928 (Berlin)
  1931 (Berlin)
  (Leipzig)
  1929 (Berlin) The Abstracts
 
  1928  (Berlin) Karl-Liebknecht-Haus
 , Brotherhood of Vagabonds
 Otto Griebel, 1929 (Dresden)
 George Grosz (Berlin)
 Lea and  Hans Grundig, 1929 
  (Dresden)
 Eugen Hoffmann 1929 (Dresden)
  1930 (Dresden)
 Heinz Kiwitz (Duisburg)
 Wilhelm Lachnit 1929 (Dresden)
  (Düsseldorf)
 Julo Levin (Düsseldorf)
  (Dresden)
 Peter Ludwigs (Düsseldorf)
  (Leipzig)
  Alice Lex-Nerlinger and Oskar Nerlinger 1928 (Berlin)
 Otto Nagel 1928, co-founder (Berlin)
 Laszlo Peri 1928
 Curt Querner 1930 (Dresden)
 Herbert Sandberg 1929 (Berlin)
  1930? (Dresden) 
 Eva Schulze-Knabe 1929 (Dresden)
  1929 (Dresden)
  (Düsseldorf)
  1930  (Dresden)

Sources 
 Meyers Großes Taschenlexikon, in 24 Bd. Bd 2. BI-Taschenbuch, Mannheim/Vienna/Zurich (1987) 
 Meyers Kleines Lexikon, in 3 Bd. Vol. 1, Leipzig (1967, 1971)

References 

Communist organisations in Germany